Joël Beya Tumetuka (born 8 December 1999) is a Democratic Republic of the Congo footballer who currently plays as a forward for TP Mazembe.

Career statistics

International

International goals
Scores and results list DR Congo's goal tally first.

References

1999 births
Living people
Democratic Republic of the Congo footballers
Democratic Republic of the Congo international footballers
Association football forwards
CS Don Bosco players
TP Mazembe players
21st-century Democratic Republic of the Congo people
Democratic Republic of the Congo A' international footballers
2020 African Nations Championship players